Azamat Asilbekovich Baimatov (born 3 December 1989) is a Kyrgyzstani professional footballer who plays as a centre back for the Kyrgyzstan national team.

Career
Baimatov played in Latvia, for FC Tranzīts, and Russia, before he returned to Kyrgyzstan.

Borneo
On 22 December 2017, Baimatov signed a one-year contract with Indonesian Liga 1 club Borneo on a free transfer. He made his league debut for Borneo on 2 April 2018 in a Mahakam derby 0–1 win against Mitra Kukar in the 2018 Liga 1.

FC Dordoi Bishkek
On 5 December 2018, FC Dordoi Bishkek announced that Baimatov had re-joined their club, signing alongside Anton Zemlianukhin and Pavel Matyash. On 3 December 2019, Dordoi Bishkek announced the departure of Baimatov at the end of his contract.

Kuala Lumpur FA
On 6 January 2020, Baimatov signed a one-year contract with Malaysia Super League club Kuala Lumpur on a free transfer.

Barito Putera
On 13 June 2021, Baimatov returned to Indonesia for joined club Barito Putera on a one-year contract. He made his league debut on 4 September, by starting in a 1–0 loss against Persib Bandung.

On 25 October, he scored his first goal for Barito Putera in a 0–1 win over Persipura Jayapura, where he scored with a header in the 55th minute.

Career Stats

International

Statistics accurate as of match played 19 March 2018

International Goals
Scores and results list Kyrgyzstan's goal tally first.

References

External links

1988 births
Living people
Kyrgyzstani footballers
Kyrgyzstan international footballers
Kyrgyzstani expatriate footballers
Association football defenders
FC Alay players
FC Tranzīts players
FK Ventspils players
FC Dordoi Bishkek players
FC Sibir Novosibirsk players
Sitra Club players
Riffa SC players
Borneo F.C. players
Kuala Lumpur City F.C. players
FC Alga Bishkek players
PS Barito Putera players
Latvian Higher League players
Russian First League players
Bahraini Premier League players
Liga 1 (Indonesia) players
Malaysia Premier League players
Footballers at the 2010 Asian Games
Footballers at the 2014 Asian Games
Asian Games competitors for Kyrgyzstan
Expatriate footballers in Latvia
Expatriate footballers in Russia
Expatriate footballers in Bahrain
Expatriate footballers in Indonesia
Expatriate footballers in Malaysia
Kyrgyzstani expatriate sportspeople in Latvia
Kyrgyzstani expatriate sportspeople in Russia
Kyrgyzstani expatriate sportspeople in Bahrain
Kyrgyzstani expatriate sportspeople in Indonesia
Kyrgyzstani expatriate sportspeople in Malaysia